Aaron Island is an island and former unincorporated community in the Canadian province of Newfoundland and Labrador.

See also 
 List of ghost towns in Newfoundland and Labrador

Ghost towns in Newfoundland and Labrador